Richard Nicholson may refer to:
 Richard Nicholson (Paralympian) (born 1970), Australian Paralympic powerlifter and athlete
 Richard Nicholson (musician) (1563–1638/39), English musician
 Richard Nicholson (rower) (born 1937), British rower
 Richard Nicholson (cricketer), English cricketer and distiller